Ángela Maria Ponce Camacho (born 18 January 1991) is a Spanish model and beauty pageant titleholder who won Miss Universe Spain 2018. Ponce made history on 29 June 2018 as the first openly transgender woman to be crowned Miss Spain. She represented her country at Miss Universe 2018 as the first openly transgender contestant competing for the title. She did not advance to the finals.

Career 
Ponce entered and won the Miss World Cadiz 2015 title. Since she won that title, she represented Cadiz in Miss World Spain 2015. At that pageant, she was unplaced. On 29 June 2018, she competed at the Miss Universe Spain 2018 pageant and won the title, becoming the first openly transgender woman to win the title. She represented Spain at the Miss Universe 2018 finals in Bangkok losing to Catriona Gray from Philippines.

References

External links

Living people
Miss Universe 2018 contestants
Spanish female models
Transgender female models
Spanish transgender people
LGBT models
21st-century Spanish women
21st-century Spanish LGBT people
People from Aljarafe
1991 births